The Estonia Open is a darts tournament that has been held since 2007.

List of winners

Men's

Women's

References

External links

Darts tournaments
Recurring sporting events established in 2007
2007 establishments in Estonia
Sports competitions in Estonia